Ornua, from the Irish "Ór Nua" meaning "new gold" (known as The Irish Dairy Board from 1961 until 2015), is an Irish agricultural cooperative, which markets and sells dairy products on behalf of its members: Irish dairy processors and Irish dairy farmers. The co-operative is Ireland’s largest exporter of Irish dairy products and owns the Kerrygold butter and cheese brand as well as Kerrygold Irish Cream Liqueur. In addition to the Kerrygold brand, its brand portfolio includes Pilgrims Choice, Dubliner, Shannongold, and BEO milk powder.

History

The Irish Dairy Board was established by an act of the Oireachtas, the Dairy Produce Marketing Act 1961, and replaced the earlier Butter Marketing Committee. It was created to centralise the overseas marketing of Irish dairy products to achieve economies of scale and greater brand recognition. At the time of the Board's creation, the European Economic Community's market was closed to Irish butter, and the United Kingdom market limited Irish imports by an import quota.

The name Kerrygold was selected to evoke "farming, naturalness, goodness and above all quality milk" as well as a sense of Irishness.  In October 1962, the Board successfully test-launched the Kerrygold brand in the Winterhill area of North West England.

When Ireland joined the EEC in 1973, the Board began expanding its presence to continental Europe, beginning with the North Rhine-Westphalia state of Germany. By 1982, Kerrygold had national distribution in Germany.

On 31 March 2015, the Board assumed a new corporate identity as Ornua: "The Home of Irish Dairy".

Today

Currently, Ornua operates from 19 subsidiaries worldwide, with pre-packing and blending facilities located in Germany, Great Britain, the United States and the Middle East. A €36m state-of-the-art Kerrygold butter production and packing plant (Kerrygold Park) has been constructed in Mitchelstown, County Cork. In 2020, Ornua announced an investment of £3m in its Leek production facilities, to boost capacity in response to greater consumer demand for its cheese products and bringing total annual production to more than 110,000 tonnes.

In 2014, the Spanish cheese manufacturer Luxtor, previously a subsidiary of the system catering chain Telepizza, was taken over.

Kerrygold is the second highest-selling butter in the United States and the highest-selling butter in Ireland as of 2019.

Butter portions and cheese items are also available for bulk consumers.

Awards
The Irish Dairy Board was awarded Exporter of the Year by the Irish Exporters in 2010.

References

External links 
 Official website

Marketing boards
Agricultural marketing cooperatives
Agriculture in the Republic of Ireland
Dairy products companies of Ireland
Cooperatives in Ireland
Cooperatives in the Republic of Ireland
Food and drink companies based in Dublin (city)
Irish brands